The Prix Marc-Vivien Foé is an award in an honour to the late Marc-Vivien Foé awarded to the best player who represents an African national football team in Ligue 1.

Award winners

By nationality

Results

2009

2010

2011

2012

2013

2014

2015

2016

2017

2018

2019

2020

2021

2022

References 

Ligue 1 trophies and awards
European football trophies and awards
Awards established in 2009
2009 establishments in France